The 1960 Atlantic Coast Conference men's basketball tournament was held in Raleigh, North Carolina, at Reynolds Coliseum from March 3–5, 1960. Duke defeated , 63–59, to win their first ACC championship. Doug Kistler of Duke was named tournament MVP.

Bracket

References

Tournament
ACC men's basketball tournament
College basketball tournaments in North Carolina
Basketball competitions in Raleigh, North Carolina
ACC men's basketball tournament
20th century in Raleigh, North Carolina